The 2017–18 season is U.S. Lecce's sixth consecutive season in Lega Pro after their relegation from Serie A at the end of the 2011–12 season. The club competed in Serie C Gruppo C, gaining promotion to Serie B, in the Coppa Italia and in the Coppa Italia Serie C.

Players

Squad information

Players in italics left the club during the season.
Players with a * joined the club during the season.

Transfers

Summer session

Winter session

Competitions

Overall

Serie C

League table

Results summary

Results by round

Matches

Coppa Italia Serie C

Matches

Supercoppa Serie C

Matches

References

U.S. Lecce seasons
Lecce